Sinocyclocheilus huanjiangensis is a species of ray-finned fish in the genus Sinocyclocheilus.

References 

huanjiangensis
Fish described in 2010